"Just a Song About Ping Pong" is a song by Australian rock band Operator Please. The song was first included on the band's debut extended play, On the Prowl, in 2006. The band later re-recorded the song after signing with Virgin Records and released this version in July 2007 as the lead single from their debut studio album, Yes Yes Vindictive. The song peaked at number 12 on the Australian ARIA Singles Chart. At the ARIA Music Awards of 2007, the song was nominated for three awards, winning ARIA Award for Breakthrough Artist - Single.

Track listings 
Australian CD single
 "Just a Song About Ping Pong"
 "Just a Song About Ping Pong" (Kissy Sell Out White Stallion remix)
 "In Motion"
 "Spying"

UK 7-inch single
A. "Just a Song About Ping Pong"
B. "In Motion"

Charts

Weekly charts

Year-end charts

References 

2006 songs
2007 singles
ARIA Award-winning songs